Giuseppe D'Altrui (born Naples April 7, 1934) is an Italian water polo player who competed in the 1956 Summer Olympics, in the 1960 Summer Olympics, and in the 1964 Summer Olympics. He is the father of Marco D'Altrui, who also won a water polo gold medal in the 1992 Summer Olympics.

Biography
In 1956 he was a member of the Italian water polo team which finished fourth in the Olympic tournament. He played five matches.

Four years later he won the gold medal with the Italian team in the Olympic tournament. He played six matches and scored one goal. At the 1964 Games he finished again fourth with the Italian team in the Olympic tournament. He played five matches and scored one goal.

See also
 Italy men's Olympic water polo team records and statistics
 List of Olympic champions in men's water polo
 List of Olympic medalists in water polo (men)
 List of members of the International Swimming Hall of Fame

References

External links
 

1934 births
Living people
Italian male water polo players
Water polo players at the 1956 Summer Olympics
Water polo players at the 1960 Summer Olympics
Water polo players at the 1964 Summer Olympics
Olympic gold medalists for Italy in water polo
Medalists at the 1960 Summer Olympics
Water polo players from Naples